Crestline Coach Ltd. is an ambulance manufacturer located in Saskatoon, Saskatchewan, Canada, with offices in Alberta, Manitoba, Ontario, Quebec, and California. The company manufactures ambulances and specialty vehicles, and also distributes buses.  The company has manufactured vehicles that have been sold into every province in Canada, the Canadian Department of National Defense as well as exported to Belgium, Brazil, Brunei, Chile, China, Colombia, Cuba, Ireland, Italy, Jordan, Korea, Kyrgyzstan, Malta, Mexico, Netherlands, Paraguay, Siberia, St Lucia, Sudan, Switzerland, United States and Vietnam.

References

Companies based in Saskatoon
Truck manufacturers of Canada
Emergency services equipment makers
Motor vehicle assembly plants in Canada
Bus manufacturers of Canada
Vehicle manufacturing companies established in 1979
1979 establishments in Saskatchewan
Ambulances